Ogugu is a community of Igala-speaking people in the Olamaboro Local Government Area of the Kogi State in north central Nigeria. Ogugu people have a culture that has been misunderstood by other Igalas. It is called Ibegwu, literally meaning ancestors. It is believed that ancestors watch over their progeny to stop them from doing mischief. For instance, an Ogugu man can not be a party to premeditated murder. He would be 'arrested' by Ibegwu. He would be struck by some mysterious ailment, the cure to which is a public confession and performance of the necessary rituals for cleansing. According to the ancestral rules, a married woman cannot have an affair with any other man. The same punishment cited above applies. Some have argued that if a man has the liberty to flirt, a woman should also have the same right. They are predominantly subsistence farmers.
Ibegwu culture is all encompassing to a woman. She is expected to be submissive to her husband in all aspect and everything she does must be with his consent.

Onoja Oboni's personality and heritage has been shrouded in mythical imagery over time. Ranging from being the Son of Eri, the grandson of Aganapoje to being a descendant of one of the Idah royal families; the priestly sub-clan of Obajeadaka in Okete-ochai-attah. The key areas of consensus are; he was a master strategist, slave raider and trader, conqueror, coloniser and imperialist. Added to these were his diplomacy, expansionist traits and the acculturation of conquered territories.

References

Alex Ojonimi Agbobaba (Adapted from Ogugu Folklores and Oral Traditions)

Ethnic groups in Nigeria